Ladislav Lipscher (1915–1990) was a Slovak historian and defector from Communist Czechoslovakia. Lipscher did much of his research before his defection, allowing him to base his works on then-inaccessible archives locked behind the Iron Curtain.

Works

References

1915 births
1990 deaths
20th-century Slovak historians
Historians of Slovakia